Brar is a Jat clan from the Punjab region. 

Notable people with the surname, who may or may not be affiliated with the tribe, include: 

Adesh Kanwarjit Singh Brar (1939–2012), Congress MLA from Punjab
Harpal Brar (born 1939), Indian communist politician, writer and businessman, based in Britain.
Harcharan Singh Brar (1919–2009), Indian politician, Chief Minister of Punjab, Governor of Orissa, and Governor of Haryana
Jagmeet Singh Brar (born 1958), Indian politician, lawyer, writer, and poet
Jarnail Singh Bhindranwale (1947–1984; born Jarnail Singh Brar), Sikh preacher and leader of Damdami Taksal
Jagbir Singh Brar Indian politician (MLA), lawyer and PWRMDC chairman (2019-present)
Karan Brar (born 1999), American actor
Mink Brar (born 1980), German-Indian model, actress, and producer
Manpreet Brar (born 1973), Indian actress and model, Femina Miss India 
Preet Brar, Punjabi musician
Raj Brar (1972–2016), Punjabi singer, actor, lyricist, and music director
Air marshal Trilochan Singh Brar (1925–2014), head of the Indian Air Force

Kuldip Singh Brar, Indian Army General

Ranveer Brar, Renowned Chef

References 

Jat clans
Indian surnames
Hindu surnames
Punjabi-language surnames
Punjabi tribes